The 2015–16 National League season (known as the Vanarama National League for sponsorship reasons) was the first season under the new title of National League, the twelfth season consisting of three divisions and the thirty-seventh season overall. 

The National League covers the top two levels of Non-League football in England. The National League is the fifth highest level of the overall pyramid, while the National League North and National League South exist at the sixth level. The top team and the winner of the play-off of the Premier division will be promoted to League Two, while the bottom four are relegated to the North or South divisions. The champions of the North and South divisions will be promoted to the Premier division, alongside the play-off winners from each division. The bottom three in each of the North and South divisions are relegated to the premier divisions of the Northern Premier League, Isthmian League or Southern League.

On 6 April 2015, it was announced that as of the 2015–16 season the League was to undergo a name change from the Football Conference to the National League. As well as the name change, the league's logo has been re-designed and the league's broadcaster BT Sport has signed a new three-year contract. The structure of the league and the title sponsor Vanarama however remain the same.

National League

Promotion and relegation
Teams promoted from 2014–15 Conference North
 Barrow (League champions)
 Guiseley (Play-off winners)

Teams promoted from 2014–15 Conference South
 Bromley (League champions)
 Boreham Wood (Play-off winners)

Teams relegated from 2014–15 League Two
 Cheltenham Town
 Tranmere Rovers

Stadia and locations

League table

Play-offs

First leg

Second leg

Final

Results

Top scorers

National League North

Promotion and relegation

Teams relegated from 2014–15 Conference Premier
 AFC Telford United
 Alfreton Town
 Nuneaton Town

Teams promoted from 2014–15 Northern Premier League Premier Division
 F.C. United of Manchester (League Champions)
 Curzon Ashton (Play-off Winners)

Teams promoted from 2014–15 Southern League Premier Division
 Corby Town (League Champions)

League table

Play-offs

First leg

Second leg

Final

Results

Stadia and locations

Top scorers

National League South

Promotion and relegation
Teams relegated from 2014–15 Conference Premier
 Dartford

Teams transferred from 2014–15 Conference North
 Oxford City

Teams promoted from 2014–15 Isthmian League Premier Division
 Maidstone United (League Champions)
 Margate (Play-off Winners)

Teams promoted from 2014–15 Southern League Premier Division
 Truro City (Play-off Winners)

League table

Play-offs

First leg

Second leg

Final

Results

Stadium and locations

Top scorers

References

 
National League (English football) seasons
5
Eng